MGM Springfield is a hotel and casino complex situated in the heart of Metro Center, Springfield, Massachusetts, United States. Opening on August 24, 2018 in a block of buildings that are historically or culturally influential to Springfield, it became the first resort casino in the Commonwealth. It is owned by Vici Properties and operated by MGM Resorts International. MGM Springfield opened its doors to the public on August 24, 2018. It was then temporarily closed on March 14, 2020, due to the COVID-19 pandemic. It reopened to the public on July 13, 2020, after nearly 4 months of being closed, with safety precautions and reduced capacity in place. Chris Kelley is the current President and COO of the MGM Springfield.

History

Proposals
MGM Springfield was one of three proposals in the city of Springfield, Massachusetts for the Western Massachusetts casino license. Casinos were also proposed for Holyoke, Palmer, and West Springfield. On December 2, 2012, MGM Springfield and Penn National Gaming's Springfield proposal became the remaining two proposals for Springfield when Ameristar withdrew its Springfield proposal for the former Westinghouse site.

On April 30, 2013, Mayor Dominic Sarno selected MGM Springfield as the winning proposal for the City of Springfield, defeating the Penn National proposal for the north end of the city, and on July 16 Springfield voters approved the casino application, making MGM Springfield the state's first proposal to win voter approval in its host community. MGM was then in a three-way race with Hard Rock's West Springfield proposal and Mohegan Sun's Palmer proposal. On September 11, 2013, West Springfield voters voted to block the Hard Rock proposal, leaving only MGM and Mohegan Sun in the race for the license. MGM Springfield won the bid for the Western Massachusetts license on November 6, 2013, when Palmer voters blocked the Mohegan Sun proposal, leaving MGM Springfield as the only Western Massachusetts proposal to win voter approval. (Had either Hard Rock or Mohegan Sun won voter approval, the state's gaming commission would have had to make the final decision.)

MGM officially received the license on June 13, 2014. It joined two other license winners: Penn National, which was awarded the slot parlor license, and Wynn Massachusetts, which was awarded the Eastern Massachusetts Region A casino license. As of November 6, 2014, it received its Region B license and is expected to open in 2018.

On November 4, 2014, a referendum attempting to ban casinos in the state failed. The plan for the construction of the casino at the time would have required the demolition of some buildings in downtown, including the partial demolition of one on the National Register of Historic Places.

MGM design

On September 22, 2015, MGM unveiled a redesigned site plan for the project, abandoning the 25-story glass-facade hotel on State Street in favor of a 6-story hotel on Main Street. The changes also included the reduction of the parking garage by one floor and the market-rate apartments being moved off-site.

MGM has pledged to create about 3,000 permanent jobs to benefit the local community. The company announced that it would have various job descriptions available, including security officer, assistant executive housekeeper, food and beverage manager, host person, 21 dealer, concierge, assistant front desk manager, front desk clerk, and housekeeper, a spokeswoman gave as some examples.

MGM Springfield opened to the public on August 24, 2018. The $960,000,000 project is built in an area that sustained significant damage by a tornado that struck Springfield on June 1, 2011. The  complex contains a gaming area surrounded by a parking garage, hotel, spa, movie theater, restaurants, and shops. The  casino features 2,550 slots, 120 table games, a high-limit room, and a poker room with 23 tables.

In 2021, MGM Resorts agreed to sell the land and buildings of MGM Springfield to MGM Growth Properties for $400 million. MGM Resorts would lease back the property and continue to operate it, paying initial rent of $30 million per year.

See also

Gambling in Massachusetts

References

External links

 

Springfield, Massachusetts
MGM Resorts International
Casinos in Massachusetts
Casino hotels
2018 establishments in Massachusetts